Jerzy Artur Bahr (23 April 1944 – 25 July 2016) was a Polish diplomat.

Life 
Bahr graduated from sociology at the Jagiellonian University (1967). In 1974, he began his diplomatic career at the Ministry of Foreign Affairs. From 1992 to 1994 he was Consul-General in Kaliningrad, from 1997 to 2001 he was the Ambassador Extraordinary and Plenipotentiary of the Republic of Poland to Ukraine, from 2001 to 2005 to Lithuania, and from 2006 to 2010 he was Ambassador Extraordinary and Plenipotentiary of the Republic of Poland to the Russian Federation. Bahr died of cancer on 25 July 2016 at the age of 72.

References 

1944 births
2016 deaths
Ambassadors of Poland to Lithuania
Ambassadors of Poland to Russia
Ambassadors of Poland to Turkmenistan
Ambassadors of Poland to Ukraine
Commander's Crosses of the Order for Merits to Lithuania
Commanders of the Order of Polonia Restituta
Commanders with Star of the Order of Polonia Restituta
Consuls-General of Poland
Diplomats of the Polish People's Republic
Jagiellonian University alumni
Diplomats from Kraków

Polish United Workers' Party members